Snellen is a Dutch surname. Snel means "quick" in Dutch and the original bearer of the name may have been a lively person. However, the origin of the surname often was patronymic, as Snel and Snelle were short forms of the archaic Germanic given name Snellaard (which originally meant "lively and strong"). People with this surname include:

 Herman Snellen (1834–1908), Dutch ophthalmologist 
  (born 1970), Dutch astronomer
  (1840–1907), Dutch meteorologist and explorer of the Arctic
 Pieter Cornelius Tobias Snellen (1834–1911), Dutch entomologist
 Samuel Constantinus Snellen van Vollenhoven (1816–1880), Dutch entomologist

See also 
 Snellen chart, an eye chart developed by Herman Snellen

References

Dutch-language surnames
Patronymic surnames